Arjhan Srong-ngamsub is a Thai football coach. He coached the Thailand national football team at the 1996 AFC Asian Cup. He is nicknamed "Kongbeng" (Zhuge Liang in Thai).

Honours
Bangkok Bank
 Kor Royal Cup Winner (3):1981, 1984, 1986
 Queen's Cup Winner (1): 1983
 Thailand FA Cup Winner (1): 1981
 League Cup Winner (1): 1988

Krung Thai Bank
 Khǒr Royal Cup Winner (1): 1993
 League Cup Winner (1): 1992

Hoang Anh Gia Lai
 V.League Champions (2): 2003, 2004
 Vietnamese Super Cup Winner (1): 2003

Phuket
 2010 Thai Division 2 League Southern Region Champions (1): 2010

References

1950 births
Living people
Expatriate football managers in Vietnam
Thai expatriate sportspeople in Vietnam
Arjhan Srong-ngamsub
Arjhan Srong-ngamsub
Thailand national football team managers
Arjhan Srong-ngamsub
Arjhan Srong-ngamsub
Arjhan Srong-ngamsub
Arjhan Srong-ngamsub
Arjhan Srong-ngamsub
Association footballers not categorized by position
Arjhan Srong-ngamsub
Binh Dinh FC managers